Letter B may refer to:

B, the second letter in the basic modern Latin alphabet
, a United States Navy patrol boat in commission from 1917 to 1919
"Letter B", a song from Sesame Street parodying The Beatles' "Let it Be"

See also
 Letter Bee, Tegami Bachi, a shonen manga